The 2022 Military Bowl was a college football bowl game played on December 28, 2022, at Navy–Marine Corps Memorial Stadium in Annapolis, Maryland. The 13th annual Military Bowl, the game featured UCF from the American Athletic Conference and Duke from Atlantic Coast Conference. The game began at 2:00 p.m. EST and was aired on ESPN. It was one of the 2022–23 bowl games concluding the 2022 FBS football season. Sponsored by technology company Peraton, the game was officially known as the Military Bowl presented by Peraton.

Teams
This was the first time that Duke and UCF have ever played each other.

UCF

The Knights, from the American Athletic Conference, finished the regular season with a record of 9–3 (6–2 in conference play).  The team tied with Cincinnati for second in the conference, with their victory over the Bearcats securing the tiebreaker to advance to the AAC Championship Game, in which they lost to Tulane, 45–28.  The Knights are led by second-year head coach Gus Malzahn. This is the 14th bowl game for the Knights.

This will be UCF's final game as a member of the AAC, as the Knights are set to join the Big 12 Conference in 2023.

Duke

The Blue Devils, from the Atlantic Coast Conference, finished the regular season with a record of 8–4 (5–3 in conference play). They are led by first-year head coach Mike Elko. This is the 15th bowl game for the Blue Devils.

Game summary

Statistics

References

Military Bowl
Military Bowl
Military Bowl
Military Bowl
UCF Knights football bowl games
Duke Blue Devils football bowl games